Huang Huoqing (1901 – November 9, 1999) was a politician of the People's Republic of China.

Biography
Huang Huoqing was born in Zaoyang County, Hubei in 1901. He joined the Communist Party of China in 1926.

After the foundation of the People's Republic of China, Huang was the Secretary of the CPC Tianjin Committee from 1953 to 1958, and the CPC Liaoning Committee from 1958 to 1971.

Huang was the Procurator-General of the Supreme People's Procuratorate from 1978 to 1983.

References

External links
  Biography of Huang Huoqing, CPC Liaoning Committee website.

1901 births
1999 deaths
Chinese Communist Party politicians from Hubei
Communist Party secretaries of Rehe Province
Delegates to the 7th National Congress of the Chinese Communist Party
Mayors of Tianjin
People's Republic of China politicians from Hubei
Political office-holders in Liaoning
Politicians from Xiangyang
Procurator-General of the Supreme People's Procuratorate